Sphaeroma terebrans is a mangrove-boring isopod that was first documented in the United States as early as 1897. The isopod is found throughout the Gulf of Mexico mainly in mangrove swamps of Louisiana and Florida. S. terebrans will also bore into boats, wooden pilings and other wooden structures.

The burrowing activities of Sphaeroma terebrans hinder the growth of mangroves, and its wood boring activities limits mangroves to the upper limits of the intertidal zone.

References

External links

Sphaeromatidae
Crustaceans described in 1866